Weimer may refer to:
 Weimer, former name of Weimar, California
 Weimer Township, Jackson County, Minnesota
 Weimer Township, Barnes County, North Dakota

People with the surname
 Tiffany Weimer (born 1983), American soccer player

Surnames from given names